Brendan Cannon (born 5 April 1973) is a former Australian rugby union footballer who played for the national team, The Wallabies and three Australian teams in the Super 12 and Super 14 competitions.

Cannon played for both the Queensland Reds and the New South Wales Waratahs in the old Super 12 competition, prior to the entry of the Western Force, whom he played with for their first season. He has been capped 42 times for Australia, making his debut in 2001 against the touring British and Irish Lions team. He previously represented Australia at U21 and U19 level. He also played 106 Super Rugby games and was the 12th player in the competition's history to achieve that milestone. His retirement in April 2007 was due to a serious neck injury that he incurred in a game against Christchurch a few weeks earlier.

In 2007 he joined with representatives from each of the major football codes in Australia to launch the White ribbon day, a campaign to stop violence against women. Since retiring from playing, he has worked as a commentator for Fox Sports in Australia.

References

Australian rugby union players
Australia international rugby union players
1973 births
Living people
Western Force players
Rugby union hookers
Queensland Reds players
New South Wales Waratahs players
Rugby union players from Brisbane